Laomian may refer to:

Laomian language, a Loloish language of Yunnan, China
Lo mein, a Chinese noodle dish